Tomarus gibbosus, the carrot beetle, is a species of rhinoceros beetle in the family Scarabaeidae.

References

Further reading

 

Dynastinae
Articles created by Qbugbot
Beetles described in 1774
Taxa named by Charles De Geer